The Merrimack Warriors represent Merrimack College in the Women's Hockey East Association during the 2016–17 NCAA Division I women's ice hockey season.

Roster

2016–17 Warriors

Schedule

|-
!colspan=12 style=""| Regular Season

|-
!colspan=12 style=""| WHEA Tournament

Awards and honors

Jan. 31:  Marie Delarbre was selected for Team Germany and competed in Tomakomai, Japan for Olympic Qualifications from February 9 to February 12. On February 12, Germany lost the final qualifying game to Japan 1-3 in the four nation tournament (Austria, France, Germany and Japan).  Delabre scored a goal with 1:06 in regulation against France, forcing overtime, which led to a German victory.
Feb. 3: Mikyla Grant-Mentis was named the January, 2017 WHEA Rookie of the month

References

Merrimack
Merrimack Warriors women's ice hockey seasons
Merri
Merri